The Conjure Woman is a 1926 silent film directed, written, produced and distributed by Oscar Micheaux. A race film featuring an African-American cast and catering to an African-American audience, it stars Evelyn Preer and Lawrence Chenault, with support from character actors Peter Verwayen, Alma Sewell and Sidney Easton. It is based on American writer Charles W. Chesnutt's 1899 short story collection of the same name. No print of the film has been located and it is presumed to be a lost film.

References

External links

1926 films
Lost American films
Films directed by Oscar Micheaux
American black-and-white films
American silent feature films
Films based on short fiction
Race films
1926 drama films
Silent American drama films
1926 lost films
Lost drama films
1920s American films